The Rough Guide to Highlife is a world music compilation album originally released in 2003. Part of the World Music Network Rough Guides series, the release covers the Highlife musical genre of Ghana and surrounding countries, focusing on the 1960s and 70s. Graeme Ewens wrote the liner notes, and Phil Stanton, co-founder of the World Music Network, was the producer. This album was followed by a second edition in 2012.

Critical reception

The compilation's release was met with positive reviews. Robert Christgau called it less even than the contemporaneous The Highlife All-Stars album Sankofa but "eccentric" nonetheless. He went on to name it the twelfth best album of 2003 in the annual Pazz & Jop poll.

Writing for AllMusic, Chris Nickson called it a "treasure trove" as more than half the album's tracks had been previously unavailable.

Track listing

References 

2003 compilation albums
World Music Network Rough Guide albums
Highlife albums